Meridor is a surname. Notable people with the surname include:

Dan Meridor (born 1947), Israeli politician
Eliyahu Meridor (1914–1966), Israeli politician, father of Dan and Sallai
Sallai Meridor (born 1955), Israeli politician
Ya'akov Meridor (1913–1995), Israeli politician and businessman